Elections for 17 of the 33 seats in Tennessee's State Senate were held on November 8, 2022. The election was concurrent with the Governor, U.S. House, and State House elections. The primary election was held on August 4, 2022.

Retirements

Republicans
District 9: Mike Bell retired.
District 31: Brian Kelsey retired.

Democrats
District 19: Brenda Gilmore retired.

Predictions

Results summary

Overview

District 1

The incumbent is Republican Mike Bell , who was redistricted from the 9th district, where he won with 77.7% of the vote against Democrat, Carl Lansden. Bell announced his retirement from the Senate.

Democratic primary

Candidates

Declared
Patricia Waters

Republican primary

Candidates

Declared
Mark Hall, member of the Tennessee House of Representatives for the 24th district. 
J. Adam Lowe, Conservative talk radio host, candidate for Tennessee Senate in 2014, candidate for Tennessee House of Representatives in 2014, Vice Chairman of the Bradley County Commission.

General election

District 3

The incumbent is Republican Rusty Crowe, who was re-elected with 100% of the vote in 2018 with no opposition. He is running for re-election.

Democratic primary

Candidates

Declared
Kate Craig, First Congressional District Chair for the Tennessee Democratic County Chairs Association (May 2019-present), former chair of the Washington County Democratic Party (May 2017 - May 2021), and former candidate for Chair of the Tennessee Democratic Party

Republican primary

Candidates

Declared
Rusty Crowe, incumbent Senator (1990-present)

General election

District 5

The incumbent is Republican Randy McNally, who was re-elected with 71.8% of the vote in 2018. He is running for re-election.

Republican primary

Candidates

Declared
Randy McNally, incumbent Senator (1987-present) 
Earle Segrest

General election

District 7

The incumbent is Republican Richard Briggs, who was re-elected with 55.6% of the vote in 2018. He is running for re-election.

Democratic primary

Candidates

Declared
Bryan Langan

Republican primary

Candidates

Declared
Richard Briggs, incumbent Senator (2015-present)
Kent A. Morrell

General election

See also
 2022 Tennessee elections
 2022 Tennessee House of Representatives election

Notes

References 

Senate
Tennessee Senate elections
Tennessee Senate